An American Aristocrat's Guide to Great Estates is a factual documentory television series commisioned by the Smithsonian Channel. It is presented by Julie Montagu, Viscountess Hinchingbrooke, the American wife of Viscount Hinchingbrooke, and explores the histories, management styles and upkeep costs of Britain's family mansions and castles.

Although initially recommissioned for a second series it was subsequently cancelled due to a change at the top of the Smithsonian Channel. This resulted in Julie Montagu setting up a production company and through the Patreon crowdfunding platform, developing a new show called ‘’American Viscountess’’ for YouTube.

Episodes

Series 1 
Series one, comprising ten episodes was aired between May and December 2020.

1. 

2. 

3. 

4. 

5. 

6. 

7. 

8. 

9. 

10.

References 

American documentary films